Lernayin Artsakh FC is an association football club based in unrecognized Stepanakert, Artsakh Republic but is registered in the town of Vayk, Vayots Dzor Province, Armenia. The club was founded in 1927 in Soviet Azerbaijan and its current name translates from Armenian as "Mountainous Artsakh".

History

The club was founded in 1927 under the name Dinamo Stepanakert. In 1960, the name was changed to Karabakh and remained by that name until 1989 when it was renamed Artsakh. During the years between 1992 and 1995 they were unable to participate in any competition due to the First Nagorno-Karabakh War. In 1995, the club moved from Stepanakert to Yerevan in order to participate in the Armenian Premier League. They subsequently changed their name back to Karabakh.

In 1999, the club was expelled from the Premier League due to financial problems, but managed return to professional football the following year. The club changed its name to Lernayin Artsakh in 2002, and played their home matches in Kapan that year.

The club withdrew from the Armenian top tier before the start of the 2003 season in protest against the exclusion of fellow Premier League club Ararat Yerevan. The next year, the club finished second in the First League and again won promotion. Their return to the highest level in 2002 was of short duration, as they withdrew after playing eleven matches. In 2006 they won promotion to the Premier League for a third time, but this time declined to enter the top flight.

In 2009, the club relocated back to Stepanakert, and started participating in the Artsakh Football League. They have moved back to the First League for 2019–20, thereby voiding their 2019 Artsakh Football League season.

Domestic records since 1978

Honours
Armenian First League (1):
2021–22

Artsakh Football LeagueWinners (2):2009-2018

Players

Current squad

References

External links
 RSSSF Armenia (and subpages per year)

Association football clubs established in 1927
Sport in the Republic of Artsakh